Elachista illota is a moth of the family Elachistidae. It is found in south-western Western Australia.

The wingspan is 9.4-11.2 mm for males. The forewings are blue. The hindwings are grey.

The larvae feed on Lepidosperma species. They mine the leaves of their host plant. Young larvae mine upwards, creating a straight and narrow initial stage of the mine. Later, the mine slowly widens and turns downwards. The whole mine, except the last 20 mm, is filled with frass. Pupation takes place outside of the mine on a leaf of the host plant.

References

Moths described in 2011
illota
Moths of Australia